2009 was the second competitive season for the Cairns based CRGT Northern Pride Rugby League Football Club. They competed in the QRL state competition, which in 2009 was called the Wizard Queensland Cup. The addition of the Sunshine Coast Sea Eagles meant 12 clubs participated, with each club playing 22 matches (11 home and 11 away) over 26 weeks. In 2009 the Wizard Queensland Cup introduced a six-team finals series (compared to five in previous years).

The Pride finished second and reached the Grand Final, losing 32–18 to the Sunshine Coast Sea Eagles at Stockland Park. Coach Andrew Dunemann left at the end of the season to take up a position as assistant coach to Rick Stone at the Newcastle Knights.

2009 Season –  CRGT Northern Pride

Staff
 Coach: Andrew Dunemann
 Assistant coaches: David Maiden & Cameron Miller
 Captain: Chris Sheppard
 Chief Executive: Denis Keeffe
 Operations Manager: Chris Sheppard

 Competition: Wizard Queensland Cup

2009 Player awards
 Most Improved Player (sponsored by the CDRL) – Nick Slyney
 Cairns Plan Printing Best Back – Rod Jensen
 Skytrans Airlines Best Forward – Mark Cantoni
 WIN Television Players' Player – Tom Humble
 John O'Brien Perpetual Club Person of the Year – Sheron McDougall
 Skill360 Northern Pride Player of the Year – Tom Humble

Player gains
  Rod Jensen from Huddersfield Giants
  Germaine Paulson from NRL South Sydney Rabbitohs
  Ben Spina from NYC North Queensland Cowboys Under-20 and Blackwater Crushers
  Chris Riesen from NYC North Queensland Cowboys Under-20 (CDRL rookie of the year)
  Scott Idec from NYC North Queensland Cowboys Under-20 and CDRL Southern Suburbs
  Tom Humble from NYC North Queensland Cowboys Under-20 and Blackwater Crushers
 Callan Myles from CDRL Ivanhoes Knights
 Steven Kim from CDRL Ivanhoes Knights
 John O’Sullivan
 Robbie Kyles

Player losses at end of 2008 season
  Jackson Nicolau to Gold Coast Titans 
  Farran Willett to Ipswich Jets 
  Stephen Sheppard to CDRL Mareeba
  Chris Afamasaga
  Eric Warria
  Kahu Wehi
  Ryan Bartlett
  Stephen Sheppard

2009 Season Launch
 Thursday 12 March 2009, 6.30pm – Centre Stage, Cairns Central

Pre-Season Boot Camp
 Echo Adventures, Tully – 31 January – 1 February

2009 Jerseys

Trial Matches

Wizard Queensland Cup matches

Ladder

Finals Series

2009 Northern Pride players

North Queensland Cowboys who played for the Northern Pride in 2009

2009 Televised Games
In 2009 games were televised by ABC TV and shown live across Queensland through the ABC1 channel at 2.00pm (AEST) on Saturday afternoons. The commentary team was Gerry Collins, Warren Boland and David Wright.
 1: Northern Pride lost 10–30 : Round 5, Saturday 11 April 2009 against Burleigh Bears from Pizzey Park, Miami, Gold Coast
 2: Northern Pride lost 18–30 : Round 15, Saturday 27 June 2009 against Sunshine Coast Sea Eagles from Stockland Park, Caloundra, Sunshine Coast
 3: Northern Pride won 54–24 : Round 18, Saturday 25 July 2009 against Redcliffe Dolphins from Dolphin Oval, Redcliffe
 4: Northern Pride won 22–10 : Semi-Final, Saturday 5 September 2009 against Central Comets from BMD Kougari Oval, Wynnum
 5: Northern Pride lost 18–32 : Grand Final, Saturday 12 September 2009 against Sunshine Coast Sea Eagles from Stockland Park, Caloundra, Sunshine Coast

External links
 Northern Pride Official site
 Northern Pride Facebook Page
 Northern Pride Twitter Page
 Northern Pride YouTube Page
 Cairns Post – Northern Pride 2009 photo gallery
 2009 Northern Pride match video highlights

Northern Pride RLFC seasons
2009 in Australian rugby league
2009 in rugby league by club